Naspur is a municipality and a suburb and mandal in Mancherial district of the Indian state of Telangana. Located the north bank of godavari river.

Naspur Pin code is 504302 and postal head office is Coal Chemical Complex (also known as CCC).

Srirampur, Seetharampally, Thallapally, Srisri Nagar, Tilak Nagar are the nearby localities to Naspur.

Mancherial, Ramagundam, Mandamarri, Bellampalle are the nearby cities to Naspur.

Administrative Divisions 
Villages in Naspur Mandal.

Geography 
It has an average elevation of 134 metres (439 feet). Total area is 23.72 km.

Sub Localities in Naspur 
A-Sector

Village naspur

Asr Nagar

Maszeed wada

Patel colony

FCI Colony

Housing board colony

Flood Colony

Nagarjuna Nagar Colony

Naspur Colony

Shirkey Colony

R&R Thallapally flats

C2 Quarters

Laxmi Nagar

Teachers Colony

Jagadhamba colony

Retired colony

Adarshnagar

RK 5 Colony

Sundarayya colony

Vidyanagar

Demographics 
 India census, Naspur had a population of 	73,616. Males constitute 51.97% of the population and females 48.02%. Naspur has an average literacy rate of 74.32%, male literacy is 82.11%, and female literacy is 66.18%. In Naspur, 7.07% of the population is under 6 years of age.

Economy 
A suburb of Mancherial Town, this town is largely inhabited by coalminers working in the Singareni Collieries company Ltd., The Coal Chemical Complex(C.C.C) of these collieries is located here.

References 

Villages in Mancherial district
Mandal headquarters in Mancherial district
Census towns in Adilabad district